Body to Body is the twelfth album of Blue System. Was published in 1996 by BMG Ariola and was produced by Dieter Bohlen. The album includes 11 new tracks.

Track listing 
All tracks by Dieter Bohlen

Charts

Credits 

Music: Dieter Bohlen
Lyrics: Dieter Bohlen
Lead Vocals: Dieter Bohlen
 Refrains, Chorus: Rolf Kohler
Arrangements: Dieter Bohlen, except tracks 3, 4, 6 and 10 arranged by Werner Becker
Producer: Dieter Bohlen
Recorded at Jeopark by Jeo and Vox Klang Studio
Distribution: BMG
Design: Ariola/Achim Natzeck
Photography: Kramer & Giogoli

References

External links

Blue System albums
1996 albums
Bertelsmann Music Group albums